Far from the Madding Crowd is a novel by Thomas Hardy.

Far from the Madding Crowd may also refer to:

Film and television
 Far from the Madding Crowd (1915 film), an early British adaptation
 Far from the Madding Crowd (1967 film), directed by John Schlesinger
 Far from the Madding Crowd (1998 film), an adaptation for British television
 Far from the Madding Crowd (2015 film), directed by Thomas Vinterberg
 "Far from the Madding Crowd", an episode of the anime Kill la Kill

Music
 Far from the Maddening Crowds, a 1997 album by Chicane
 Far from the Madding Crowd, a 2004 album by the progressive metal band Wuthering Heights

Other uses
 "Far from the Madding Crowd", a quotation from the poem Elegy Written in a Country Churchyard by Thomas Gray

See also
 The Madding Crowd, a 2000 album by Nine Days